The 2009 Foot Locker Cross Country Championships were held in San Diego, California on December 12, 2009. It was the twentieth edition of the championships, held in Balboa Park for the eighth straight year.

Results

Championship Boy's Race

Cross country running competitions
Cross country running in the United States
Sports competitions in San Diego
2000s in San Diego
2009 in sports in California
Cross country running in California